Ice Cream Soldier may refer to:

Ice Cream Soldier (DC Comics), a member of Sgt. Rock's Easy Company
Ice Cream Soldier (G.I. Joe), a member of G.I. Joe

See also
Ice Soldiers, a 2013 film